This is a complete list of episodes of Disney's The New Adventures of Winnie the Pooh. The series premiered on January 17, 1988 on Disney Channel. Thirteen episodes were aired on the network before the series moved to ABC that fall.

Series overview

Episodes

Season 1 (1988–89)
The early half of the season was animated by TMS with the exception of “The Wishing Bear”, which was animated by Walt Disney Animation Australia. Walt Disney Animation Australia later took over animation production of the series, starting with “Fish Out of Water”.

Season 2 (1989)
Walt Disney Animation Australia animated most of the episodes of Season 2, with the exception of “To Catch a Hiccup”, which was animated by Walt Disney Animation Japan.

Season 3 (1990)

Walt Disney Animation Australia animated nearly of the episodes of Season 3, with the exception of “April Pooh” which was animated by Walt Disney Animation UK Limited.

Season 4 (1991)
This season was animated both by Wang Animation and Hanho Heung-Up.

Additional specials

See also

Winnie-the-Pooh
List of Winnie-the-Pooh characters
The New Adventures of Winnie the Pooh

References

External links
Winnie-the-Pooh Episode Guide
 

Winnie-the-Pooh television series
New Adventures of Winnie
Lists of Disney Channel television series episodes